"Got the All Overs For You (All over Me)' is a 1972 single by Freddie Hart and the Heartbeats.  "Got the All Overs For You (All over Me)" was Freddie Hart's fourth number one on the country chart.  The single stayed at number one for  three weeks at and spent a total of sixteen weeks on the country chart.

Chart performance

References 
 

Freddie Hart songs
1972 singles
Capitol Records singles
Songs written by Freddie Hart
1972 songs